Vasilisa Volokhova (floruit 1591; Russian: Василиса Волохова) was a Russian noblewoman and courtier, the royal governess and nurse of Prince Dmitry of Uglich. She was said to have participated in the murder of the prince in 1591.

References
 Допрос Василисы Волоховой. Российский общеобразовательный портал

16th-century Russian people
Russian nobility
Governesses to the Imperial Russian court
16th-century Russian women
Russian courtiers